Just Another Immigrant is an American television docuseries starring Romesh Ranganathan that premiered on June 8, 2018 on Showtime. The series is executive produced by Eric Pankowski, Benjamin Green, David Garfinkle, Jay Renfroe, and Ranganathan.

Premise
Just Another Immigrant follows Ranganathan as he uproots his entire family – his supportive wife, their three kids, his Sri Lankan mother and his eccentric uncle – and immigrates to the U.S. Displaced in Los Angeles, Ranganathan attempts to find success and happiness, while rebuilding a life from scratch. In addition to his efforts to adapt, he has committed himself to booking a U.S. gig – the 6,000-seat Greek Theater – with only three months to sell it out. The series chronicles the true-life adventures of this modern immigrant family and the obstacles of making it in today’s America."

Production
On April 30, 2018, it was announced that Showtime had given the production a series order for a first season consisting of ten episodes. Executive producers include Eric Pankowski, Benjamin Green, Romesh Ranganathan, David Garfinkle, and Jay Renfroe, with Green directing. Production companies involved with the series include Ranga Bee Productions, JSA Olive Oil and Renegade.

Episodes

References

External links

2018 American television series debuts
2010s American documentary television series
English-language television shows
Showtime (TV network) original programming
Works about immigration to the United States